Concord was an electoral district of the Legislative Assembly of the Australian state of New South Wales, created in 1930, and named after and including the Sydney suburb of Concord. It was abolished in 1968.

History
The suburb of Concord was part of the five member district of Ryde under proportional representation. Proportional representation was abolished in 1927, with the suburb of Concord being split between Ryde and Eastwood. Eastwood was abolished in the 1929 redistribution and the new district of Concord was created, being entirely south of the harbour, from Concord in the east to part of the suburb of Lidcombe. Concord was abolished in 1968 and largely replaced by Yaralla which extended west to the districts of Parramatta and Granville, while the southern part of the district was absorbed by Auburn.

Members for Concord

Election results

References

1930 establishments in Australia
Constituencies established in 1930
1968 disestablishments in Australia
Constituencies disestablished in 1968